Cristian Eduardo Esnal Fernández (born May 2, 1986) is a Salvadoran footballer of Uruguayan descent, who last played professionally for Club Atlético River Plate (Uruguay). Esnal is the son of assassinated Uruguayan footballer Raúl Esnal and Cousin of Alexis Rolín.

Career
He began his career playing for C.D. Chalatenango. After that season he caught the attention of C.D. Águila. He participated in the 2007 pre-Olympic qualifiers but failed to see any playing time. In October 2009, Esnal left Águila to join second division side Dragón.

On July 27, 2010, Esnal signed to Uruguayan first division club Montevideo Wanderers.

He was called up by Ruben Israel for the El Salvador friendly against Venezuela. On August 7, 2011, Esnal started the match but was subbed-out at the 67th minute for a more offensive technique.

Cristian abruptly canceled his contract with UES and left El Salvador in 2013 and moved to his father's birth country of Uruguay because his family was threatened by extortionists. He signed a contract with River Plate in 2014.

As of April 2017, he resides in Los Angeles, California, and is a free agent.

He played during the 2017 Spring Season with Ozzy's Laguna FC (United Premier Soccer League) and Santa Clarita Storm (UPSL), and was selected once as UPSL National Player Of The Week (March 3, 2017) and also received All-UPSL Team honors for the 2017 Spring Season.

International caps and goals
El Salvador's goal tally first.

References

External links
 
 

1986 births
Living people
Sportspeople from San Salvador
Association football defenders
Salvadoran footballers
Salvadoran people of Uruguayan descent
C.A. Rentistas players
C.D. Chalatenango footballers
C.D. Águila footballers
Atlético Balboa footballers
Club Atlético River Plate (Montevideo) players
Montevideo Wanderers F.C. players
C.D. Juventud Independiente players
Expatriate footballers in Uruguay
El Salvador international footballers